The cripple punk movement, also known as cpunk, crippunk, or cr*pple punk, is a social movement regarding disability rights that rejects inspirational portrayals of those with disabilities on the sole basis of their disability.

Started by Tyler Trewhella in 2014 on Tumblr, the movement draws inspiration from ideas and values of the punk subculture. It challenges the idea that people with disabilities need to appear morally good to deserve the conditional support of able-bodied people, and instead advocates for the solidarity of disabled people who appear not to conform to normative standards through their appearance, body size, dress, use of a mobility aid, drug use, or physical deformity.

Origins 
The cripple punk tag was started in 2014 by a Tumblr user, Tyler Trewhella, who posted a picture standing with a cane and a lit cigarette, with the caption "cripple punk" layered over the top, and the description "i'm starting a movement." The post would go on to be liked and reblogged by over 40,000 people, with the caption being used as a tag to boost other posts and images of disabled people going against the typical perception of people with disabilities.

Ideology 
Cripple punk ideology centers and prioritizes the experiences of disabled people over the pressure to conform to the standards that able-bodied people uphold. The movement is made explicitly by and for people with disabilities and aims to depict how they navigate the world, as opposed to able-bodied people. Participation is not contingent on people being comfortable with using the word "cripple", and alternative spellings or censoring is accepted. The movement tries to change ideas that people with disabilities need to be entirely unproblematic, without fault, and give all of their energy to trying to act or look less disabled; or that of disabled people being either a source of inspiration or that of pity. Instead, it focuses on basic survival and quality of life improvement for disabled people through the support and solidarity of other disabled people. It also supports unlearning forms of internalized ableism, and those who are going through the process of doing so.

See also 

 Inspiration porn
 Disability pride
 Crip (disability term)

References 

Disability culture
Punk